Ecklonia radiata, commonly known as spiny kelp or leather kelp, is a species of kelp found in the Canary Islands, the Cape Verde Islands, Madagascar, Mauritania, Senegal, South Africa, Oman, southern Australia, Lord Howe Island, and New Zealand.

Ecklonia radiata grows in kelp beds on reefs and where sheltered can form dense 'forests'.

References links

radiata
Algae of Australia
Taxa named by Carl Adolph Agardh
Taxa named by Jacob Georg Agardh
Plants described in 1848